Tatar is a village in the Jabrayil District of Azerbaijan.

References 

Populated places in Jabrayil District